All-New Wolverine is a comic book series published by Marvel Comics that ran between 2015 and 2018 as part of the All-New, All-Different Marvel relaunch. The series was the first to star Logan's clone Laura Kinney (formerly X-23) in the role as Wolverine. The plot introduces Laura's clone sisters, the youngest of which, Gabby, end up becoming her companion during their adventures.

Publication history
The character Laura Kinney becomes the new Wolverine in the series, succeeding her father Logan after his death, with a new costume resembling the original Wolverine's. The series was written by Tom Taylor with art by David López.

The series began being reprinted in the UK in Panini's Wolverine and Deadpool title beginning in August 2016.

Plot
Laura tries to stop an assassination attempt in Paris and discovers the killer is a clone of her that is unable to feel pain. Alchemax contact her and explain that a genetics laboratory has been destroyed by fire and that four clones are on the run. Robert Chandler Director of Genetics explains that the sisters have had advanced security training, but have not developed claws or a healing factor or a conscience like Laura, and they are out for revenge. She agrees to find them but only to protect the innocent. Returning to her apartment in the Bronx Laura finds the younger clone Gabby has come to ask for her help. Gabby has set a small fire in the bedroom and uses the distraction to leave. With some difficulty Laura is able to track Gabby and finds the others hiding out in the sewers. The white haired clone Bellonna shoots Laura before she has a chance to talk. When she awakens Laura realizes that somehow the Alchemax soldiers have also tracked them down. The sisters are out for revenge but Laura insists on no killing, and subdues all the soldiers non-lethally. Out of nowhere the sisters are all shot, and Taskmaster appears. Furious she battles Taskmaster and although he matches her moves she is able to severely maim him. She is surprised to find the sisters are not dead, thanks to the body armor they were wearing. Bellona wants to kill Taskmaster so he cannot follow them but Laura argues against killing, but Zelda shoots him in the kneecaps instead. They escape but again the Alchemax soldiers attack in an explosive car chase, and Laura realizes she has been implanted with a tracker and cuts it out. Laura battles the soldiers giving the sisters time to escape. Laura eventually finds the sisters again, but Zelda is dying because something Alchemax has done is slowly killing them. In need of help but unable to contact her friends because Alchemax is watching Laura turns to Doctor Strange for help. Doctor Strange tries to help them but cannot do anything about the nanotechnology causing the problem. Bellona accidentally unleashes a mystical monster they must fight. Zelda's condition worsens so Strange transports them to Pym Laboratories.

Reception
The series holds an average rating of 7.9 by 234 professional critics on review aggregation website Comic Book Roundup.

Prints

Issues

Annuals

Collected editions

References

External links
 
 

American comics
Comics about cloning
2015 comics debuts
Wolverine (comics) titles
X-23 titles